The national rugby union teams of England and South Africa (the Springboks) have been playing each other in Test rugby since 1906, and by November 2022 had met in 45 Test matches. South Africa lead the series by 27 wins to 16, with 2 matches drawn. Their first meeting was on 8 December 1906, as part of South Africa's first tour of Europe, with the match ending in a 3-3 draw. The most recent meeting between the two teams was in the 2022 end-of-year rugby union internationals, on 26 November 2022, which South Africa won 27-13.
The two highest-profile matches between the sides were the 2007 and the 2019 Rugby World Cup finals, both of which were won by South Africa.

Summary

Overall

Records
Note: Date shown in brackets indicates when the record was last set.

Results

List of series

References

External links

  
England national rugby union team matches
South Africa national rugby union team matches
Rugby union rivalries in England
Rugby union rivalries in South Africa
South Africa–United Kingdom relations